KWEW-LP (96.3 FM, "Fearless 96.3") is a radio station broadcasting a Christian music format. Licensed to Wenatchee, Washington, United States, the station is currently owned by Wenatchee Youth Radio.

References

External links
 
 

WEW-LP
WEW-LP
Wenatchee, Washington